The 2018 F3 Americas Championship powered by Honda was the inaugural season for the all-new FIA Formula 3 regional series across North America, sanctioned by SCCA Pro Racing, the professional racing division of the Sports Car Club of America. This was the third season in total for Formula 3 racing in the United States, which was last run in 2001 with the United States Formula Three Championship.

The season began on 4 August at Pittsburgh International Race Complex and concluded on 21 October at Circuit of the Americas, after 17 races to be held at 6 meetings.

Teams and drivers

Race calendar
All races were held on permanent road courses in the United States. The series schedule was announced on May 9, 2018.

Championship standings

Points are awarded as follows:

Drivers' standings

Teams Championship

Notes

References

External links 
 Official website: F3 Americas Championship

F3 Americas Championship
F3 Americas Championship
Formula Regional Americas Championship
America F3